David A. Ganong,  (born September 14, 1943 in St. Stephen, New Brunswick) is a Canadian business executive.

Biography
Ganong is the former president and current chairman of the board of Ganong Bros., the oldest chocolate manufacturing company in Canada. He graduated with a BA degree from the University of New Brunswick in 1965 then earned his MBA degree University of Western Ontario.

In 1977 he replaced his uncle, R. Whidden Ganong, as president of the company. In 1984-85, David Ganong served as chairman of the Atlantic Provinces Economic Council. In 1990 he oversaw the building of a modern new plant. Its success was followed by a further expansion in 2003. He was named a member of the Order of Canada in 2005 and was inducted into the Canadian Professional Sales Association Hall of Fame in 1999. In 2008 David Ganong stepped down as president, but has maintained an advisory role as chairman on the company's board and remains the controlling shareholder. Two of his children have moved into executive positions with the company, representing the fifth generation of Ganong overseeing the company; daughter Bryana Ganong as president and CEO, and son Nicholas Ganong as Vice President of Sales and Business Development.

David Ganong is a member of the board of governors of the University of New Brunswick and he and his wife Diane have provided financial support to the university. In recent years, David has taken an active role in a number of community development groups, most recently with Future St. Stephen.

Notes
 Folster, David. The Chocolate Ganongs of St. Stephen, New Brunswick (1991) Goose Lane Editions 
 Craigs, Melodie. Ganong, The Candy Family (1984) Literacy Council of Fredericton 
David and Diane Ganong's donation to the University of New Brunswick
February 2003 Candy Industry article on David Ganong and Ganong Bros.
Profile of David Ganong, The Governor General's Canadian Leadership Conference

References

1943 births
Businesspeople from New Brunswick
People from St. Stephen, New Brunswick
Canadian chief executives
Members of the Order of Canada
Canadian Baptists
David
Living people
University of Western Ontario alumni
University of New Brunswick alumni
Sun Life Financial
Canadian corporate directors
Canadian chairpersons of corporations